The following is a timeline of the history of the city of Toledo, Ohio, USA.

Prior to 20th century

 1835
 Toledo Blade newspaper begins publication.
 Lucas County, Ohio established.
 1836 - Erie and Kalamazoo Railroad begins operating.
 1837
 Toledo incorporated.
 John Berdan becomes mayor.
 Fire Department established.
 1845 - Miami and Erie Canal opens.
 1850 - Population: 3,829.
 1851 - Toledo Medical Association founded.
 1862 - Cherry Street bridge built.
 1864 - Toledo Library Association formed.
 1869 - Wheeling and Lake Erie Railway in operation.
 1870
 Toledo Society of Natural Sciences established.
 Population: 31,584.
 1872 - Toledo University of Arts and Trades established.
 1873
 St. Ursula Academy founded.
 Toledo Public Library opens.
 1875 - Milburn Wagon Company in business.
 1877 - Railroad strike.
 1880 - Population: 50,137.
 1888 - Libbey Glass Company in business.
 1894 - Tiedtke's grocery in business.
 1896 - Lucas County Court House built.
 1898 - First Church of Christ, Scientist built.
 1900
 Toledo Zoological Gardens established.
 Population: 131,822.

20th century

 1901
 Toledo Museum of Art founded.
 Toledo Scale Company in business.
 1902 - Toledo Automobile Club established.
 1907 - Isaac R. Sherwood becomes U.S. representative for Ohio's 9th congressional district.
 1910
 Willys-Overland automobile plant built.
 Roman Catholic Diocese of Toledo established.
 1918 - Municipal Hospital opens.
 1920 - Population: 243,164.
 1929 - Hillcrest Hotel built.
 1930 - Indiana Avenue YMCA and Toledo Hospital building on North Cove Boulevard  open.
 1931
 High Level Bridge built.
 Sister city relationship established with Toledo, Spain.
 1932 - National City Bank Building constructed.
 1934 - April 12: Auto-Lite strike begins.
 1936 - Brand Whitlock Homes built.
 1937 - Point Place becomes part of city.
 1938 - Owens Corning Corporation headquartered in city.
 1950 - Population: 303,616.
 1953 - WGTE-TV begins broadcasting.
 1954
 "Islamic Center" built.
 Miracle Mile Drive-In cinema opens.
 1955 - Toledo-Lucas County Port Authority and Downtown Toledo Associates established.
 1959 - Toledo Opera founded.
 1964 - Toledo Botanical Garden established.
 1966 - Reynolds Corners becomes part of city.
 1968 - Toledo Metropolitan Area Council of Governments established.
 1969
 July 4: Ohio Fireworks Derecho.
 Masonic Auditorium and Fiberglas Tower built.
 1970 - Toledo-Lucas County Public Library established.
 1971 - Franklin Park Mall in business.
 1978 - Western Lake Erie Historical Society founded.
 1982 - One SeaGate hi-rise and DiSalle Government Center built.
 1983 - Marcy Kaptur  becomes U.S. representative for Ohio's 9th congressional district.
 1984 - Toledo Northwestern Ohio Food Bank established.
 1985 - Franklin Park Mall cinema in business.
 1987 - SeaGate Convention Centre opens.
 1990 - Population: 332,943.
 1992 - Toledo Natural Food Cooperative opens.
 1994 - Carty Finkbeiner becomes mayor.
 1997 - Toledo's Attic (city history website) launched.
 1998 - City website online (approximate date).

21st century

 2002
 Fifth Third Field (stadium) opens.
 Jack Ford becomes mayor.
 2005 - October 15: 2005 Toledo riot.
 2006 - Carty Finkbeiner becomes mayor again.
 2009 - Huntington Center (arena) opens.
 2010
 Michael Bell becomes mayor.
 Population: 287,208.
 2014 - D. Michael Collins becomes mayor.
 2015 - February: Mayor Collins dies; Paula Hicks-Hudson becomes acting mayor.
 2018 - Wade Kapszukiewicz becomes mayor.

See also
 Toledo history
 List of mayors of Toledo, Ohio
 National Register of Historic Places listings in Lucas County, Ohio

Other cities in Ohio
 Timeline of Cincinnati
 Timeline of Cleveland
 Timeline of Columbus, Ohio

References

Bibliography

 
 . + Chronology

External links

 
 
 
 
 Items related to Toledo, Ohio, various dates (via Digital Public Library of America).

 
Years in Ohio
Toledo